My Village is a 1942 Bollywood film.

References

External links
 

1942 films
1940s Hindi-language films
Indian black-and-white films
1950s English-language films